Les Bordes is the name or part of the name of the following communes in France:

 Ampilly-les-Bordes, in the Côte-d'Or department
 Jabreilles-les-Bordes, in the Haute-Vienne department
 La Celle-les-Bordes, in the Yvelines department
 Les Bordes, Indre, in the Indre department
 Les Bordes, Loiret, in the Loiret department, site of renowned golf course
 Les Bordes, Saône-et-Loire, in the Saône-et-Loire department
 Les Bordes, Yonne, in the Yonne department
 Les Bordes-Aumont, in the Aube department
 Les Bordes-sur-Arize, in the Ariège department
 Les Bordes-sur-Lez, in the Ariège department
 Villeneuve-les-Bordes, in the Seine-et-Marne department

See also
 Bordes (disambiguation)